Chamravattam is a village located in Malappuram district, Kerala, India.  This village is on the shores of the Bharathapuzha.

Computer Literacy
With the fulfillment of the Akshaya Project initiated by the Kerala State information technology mission, Chamaravattam is the first 100 per cent computer-literate village in the nation of India.  At least one member of each family will be able to use a personal computer for such tasks as editing pictures, composing text, surfing the Internet and sending e-mails.

Chamravattam Regulator-cum-Bridge

This also known as Chamravattam Palam or Chamravattam Bridge or Chamravattam Regulator-cum-Bridge or Chamravattam RcB or just Chamravattam Project.
Chamravattam Regulator-cum-Bridge, is built across Bharathapuzha aka Nila. The bridge has 978 m length and 10.5 m width. It connects Ponnani and Tirur.

References 

Villages in Malappuram district
Kuttippuram area